Shabazz the Disciple, also known as Scientific Shabazz, born David Collins, is a rapper from the Red Hook Houses of Red Hook, Brooklyn. He is an original member of the Sunz of Man and Da Last Future.

Biography 
Shabazz appeared in the 1994 Gravediggaz hit single "Diary of a Madman" of 6 Feet Deep album. He formed the duo the Disciples with Killah Priest, and later formed Celestial Souljahz with Freestyle of Arsonists.

Shabazz released a handful of singles in the mid-90s, such as "Death Be The Penalty/Conscious Of Sin", "Crime Saga", "Street Parables/Organized Rime Part 2", "The Lamb's Blood" and "Ghetto Apostles", in anticipation of his planned 1998 debut LP on GZA's GZA Entertainment imprint. However, the label folded and his relationship with the Clan soon strained, leading him to cut his Wu-affiliated ties. He is also known for being an influence on the late Big Pun.

In 1997, Shabazz The Disciple featured on "Elimination Process" of Gravediggaz's second album The Pick, the Sickle and the Shovel.

In 2003, Shabazz finally released his debut album, The Book of Shabazz (Hidden Scrollz) for Battle Axe Records, featuring his past singles "Crime Saga", "Street Parables", "Organized Rime Part 2", "The Lamb's Blood" and "Ghetto Apostles" as well as the single "Red Hook Day" b/w "Thieves in da Nite (Heist)".

In 2006, released his second album The Passion of the Hood Christ for Block Exchange. In 2008, Shabazz formed the group T.H.U.G. Angels with fellow Sunz of Man member Hell Razah. The group's debut album Welcome to Red Hook Houses, was released July 8, 2008, on Babygrande Records. In 2008, he released also The Vault (Hidden Safiyahz) album for ChamberMusik.

In 2010, Shabazz The Disciple released another studio album, Hood Scripturez, produced entirely by DJ Extremidiz for Metal Barz Records. In 2011, he released the album Hood Hopera (Theatrica Biblica) for ChamberMusik.

Discography

Studio albums

Singles

Appearances

References 

1973 births
African-American male rappers
Five percenters
Living people
Rappers from Brooklyn
Sunz of Man members
Wu-Tang Clan affiliates
People from Red Hook, Brooklyn
20th-century American rappers
21st-century American rappers